The 2022 Ally 400 was a NASCAR Cup Series race held on June 26, 2022, at Nashville Superspeedway in Lebanon, Tennessee. Contested over 300 laps on the  superspeedway, it was the 17th race of the 2022 NASCAR Cup Series season.

Report

Background
The track was built in 2001 and is currently used for events, driving schools and GT Academy, a reality television competition.

Nashville Superspeedway is owned by Dover Motorsports, Inc., which also owns Dover International Speedway. Nashville Superspeedway was the longest concrete oval in NASCAR during the time it was on the NASCAR Xfinity Series and NASCAR Camping World Truck Series circuits. Current permanent seating capacity is approximately 25,000. Additional portable seats are brought in for some events, and seating capacity can be expanded to 150,000. Infrastructure is in place to expand the facility to include a short track, drag strip, and road course.

Entry list
 (R) denotes rookie driver.
 (i) denotes driver who is ineligible for series driver points.

Practice

Practice results

Qualifying
The final round of qualifying was cancelled due to rain.

Qualifying results

Race

Stage Results

Stage One
Laps: 90

Stage Two
Laps: 95

Final Stage Results

Stage Three
Laps: 115

Race statistics
 Lead changes: 18 among 7 different drivers
 Cautions/Laps: 10 for 57
 Red flags: 2 for weather
 Time of race: 3 hours, 35 minutes and 15 seconds
 Average speed:

Media

Television
NBC Sports covered the race on the television side. Although NBC was scheduled to air the race, the numerous lightning delays, which caused the race to run past NBC's window, necessitated that the race's conclusion be moved to USA Network. Rick Allen, Jeff Burton, Steve Letarte, and Dale Earnhardt Jr. called the race from the broadcast booth. Dave Burns, Parker Kligerman and Marty Snider handled the pit road duties from pit lane. Rutledge Wood served as a “CityView” reporter and shared stories from Nashville's famous Tootsie's Orchid Lounge.

Radio
Radio coverage of the race was broadcast by Motor Racing Network (MRN) and simulcast on Sirius XM NASCAR Radio. This would be the final Nashville race covered by MRN Radio, radio rights shifted to PRN for 2023 onwards.

Standings after the race

Drivers' Championship standings

Manufacturers' Championship standings

Note: Only the first 16 positions are included for the driver standings.
. – Driver has clinched a position in the NASCAR Cup Series playoffs.

References

Ally 400
NASCAR races at Nashville Superspeedway
Ally 400
Ally 400